The Democratic Republic of the Congo national handball team is the national handball team of the DR Congo.

Results

World Championship
2021 – 28th  place

African Nations Championship

Team

Current squad
The squad chosen for the 2021 World Men's Handball Championship in Egypt.

Head coach: Francis Tuzolana

References

External links

IHF profile

Men's national handball teams
Handball